Gavin Weightman (4 March 1945 – 18 December 2022) was a British journalist and documentary filmmaker who specialised in the social history of London and Britain from the 18th century. 

For London Weekend Television, he produced and directed The Making of Modern London (1815–1914), The River Thames, Bright Lights Big City, Brave New Wilderness, and City Safari, among other series. 

His books included The Making of Modern London, co-authored with Steve Humphries (recently re-issued by The Ebury Press); The Frozen Water Trade; Signor Marconi's Magic Box; and The Industrial Revolutionaries. His journalism included many articles for New Society magazine in the 1970s. 

Weightman lived in north London and latterly concentrated on writing social history books. He died at the Royal London Hospital on 18 December 2022, at the age of 77.

Publications (selected)
1983: The Making of Modern London, 1815-1914 with Stephen Humphries (Sidgwick & Jackson)
1984: The Making of Modern London, 1914-1939 with Stephen Humphries (Sidgwick & Jackson)
1986: City Safari: Wildlife in London with Mike Birkhead (Sidgwick & Jackson)
1987: Christmas Past with Stephen Humphries (Sidgwick & Jackson)
1990: London River: The Thames Story (Collins & Brown)
1991: The Seaside (Collins & Brown)
1991: Picture Post Britain (Collins & Brown)
1991: London Past (Collins & Brown)
1992: Bright Lights, Big City: London entertained, 1830-1950 (Collins & Brown)
1992: Rescue: the history of Britain's emergency services (Boxtree, Channel Four)
1998: Polar Explorers (Explorers and Exploration series, Grolier Educational)
1998: North America (Explorers and Exploration series, Grolier Educational)
2003: Signor Marconi's Magic Box: The Most Remarkable Invention of the 19th Century & The Amateur Inventor Whose Genius Sparked a Revolution (Da Capo Press)
2003: What the Industrial Revolution Did for Us (BBC)
2003: The Frozen-Water Trade: a true story (Hyperion)
2005: London's Thames: the river that shaped a city and its history (St Martin's Press)
2007: The Industrial Revolutionaries: the creation of the modern world, 1776-1914 (Atlantic)
2007: The making of Modern London: a People's history of the Capital from 1815 to the present day (Ebury Press)
2011: Children of Light: how electricity changed Britain forever ( Atlantic)
2011: Restoration Home:the essential guide to tracing the history of your house (BBC Books)
2012: Secrets of a Titanic Victim: the story of the Real My Fair Lady ( backstory.la)
2015: Eureka: how invention happens (Yale University Press)
2020: ''The Great Inoculator: The untold story of Daniel Sutton and his medical revolution (Yale University Press)

References

The British Library has many faculty reading lists.

Gavin Weightman's Official Website 

1945 births
2022 deaths
English male journalists
Historians of the British Isles